César Alipio Paredes Canto (22 November 1941 – 7 May 2018) was a Peruvian academic and former Fujimorist politician who served as Second Vice President of Peru between 1995 and 2000 during the second term of Alberto Fujimori.

Early life and career 
Parades was born in Cajamarca on 22 November 1941. Paredes was a member of the Fujimorist Cambio 90-New Majority alliance and was elected as the Second Vice President of Peru in the 1995 elections and was Second Vice President during the second term of President Alberto Fujimori from 1995 to 2000. After serving for one term as Second Vice President, Paredes Canto didn't run for re-election as Second Vice President. In the 2001 elections, he ran for Congress for a seat under the People's Solution coalition, but was not elected and retired from politics. He died on 7 May 2018 of a heart attack.

References

1941 births
2018 deaths
Vice presidents of Peru
People from Cajamarca
Fujimorista politicians